Corneal dystrophy-perceptive deafness syndrome, also known as Harboyan syndrome, is a rare genetic disorder characterized by congenital hereditary corneal dystrophy that occurs alongside progressive hearing loss of post-lingual onset.

Signs and symptoms 

The following is a list of the symptoms people with this condition exhibit:

 Corneal dystrophy
 Clouding of the cornea
 Nystagmus
 Blurry vision
 Generalized vision impairment
 Progressive post-lingual hearing loss

The latter usually appears between the ages of 20 and 30 years old.

Complications 

The hearing loss and visual impairment associated with this condition can cause difficulties with living.

Treatment 

Although this condition has no cure, it can be treated.

Hearing loss 

 Hearing aids
 Cochlear implant

Corneal dystrophy 

 Contact lenses
 Corneal transplant

Diagnosis 

A diagnosis can be made by general symptom examination and with both ophthalmologic and audiometric studies.

Genetics 

This condition is caused by mutations in the SLC4A11 gene which are inherited in an autosomal recessive manner (most of the time). Desir et al. (2007) identified mutations in this gene in 6 families, of which 3 were consanguineous and 3 weren't, they found homozygosity for the mutation in the consanguineous families and compound heterozygosity in the non-consanguineous families.

Prevalence 

According to OrphaNet, only 24 cases from 11 families across the world have been described in medical literature, these families' origins were very diverse, including Indigenous South American, Sephardic Jewish, Brazilian (of Portuguese descent), Dutch, Romani, Moroccan, and Dominican.

See also 

 Corneal dystrophy
 Sensorineural hearing loss

References 

Syndromes affecting the nervous system
Rare genetic syndromes
Autosomal recessive disorders